"Pink Venom" is a song recorded by South Korean girl group Blackpink for their second studio album Born Pink (2022). It was released through YG Entertainment and Interscope Records as a pre-release single on August 19, 2022. Described as a hip-hop, pop rap, dance and EDM song that incorporates Korean traditional instruments, the track was written by Teddy and Danny Chung and composed by Teddy, 24, R. Tee, and Ido. Lyrically, it expresses Blackpink's confidence and deadly charm.

"Pink Venom" peaked at number one on the Billboard Global 200 chart for two weeks, becoming the first number-one hit by a girl group. In South Korea, the track topped Billboards South Korea Songs chart for two weeks and peaked at number two on the Circle Digital Chart. It became the first song by a K-pop group to top Australia's ARIA Singles Chart, and topped the charts in Hong Kong, Indonesia, Malaysia, Philippines, Singapore, Taiwan and Vietnam. The track also reached the top ten in Canada, Croatia, Hungary, Japan, and New Zealand, and peaked at number 22 on both the US Billboard Hot 100 and the UK Singles Chart. An accompanying music video was directed by Seo Hyun-seung and released alongside the single itself on Blackpink's YouTube channel. It received 90.4 million views within 24 hours, the biggest 24-hour debut for a music video in 2022.

Background and release
On July 6, 2022, YG Entertainment announced that Blackpink was in the process of finishing recording for their new album and preparing to shoot a music video in mid-July for release in August. The label also confirmed that the group would embark on the largest world tour by a K-pop girl group in history. On July 31, YG Entertainment officially released the album trailer video through the group's official social media accounts, announcing that the world tour would start in October, following a pre-release single in August and the album itself in September. The label later confirmed that two music videos were filmed to support the album, reportedly with the highest production budgets they have ever invested into a music video. On August 7, 2022, it was announced that the album's pre-release single would be titled "Pink Venom" and released on August 19.

On August 10, two sets of individual member teaser posters were posted to Blackpink's official social media accounts. On August 11 and 12, two sets of concept teaser videos were released for each individual member. On August 13, the credits of the song were reported through a teaser poster with all four members together. A new concept video was presented a day later, showing all four members being trapped in a glass box. On August 17, the teaser for the music video was released. On August 19, the music video was premiered and released alongside the "#PinkVenomChallenge".

Composition 
"Pink Venom" was written by Teddy Park and Danny Chung and composed by Teddy, 24, R. Tee, and Ido, while production was handled by 24, R. Tee, and Ido. It was described as a dance and EDM, hip-hop and pop rap song that incorporates traditional Korean instruments such as the geomungo. The song was composed in the key of C major at 90 beats per minute. Lyrically, it expresses Blackpink's confidence and dual identity as both sweet and deadly. On the track's title, Jennie commented, "Since 'pink' and 'venom' have contradicting images, we thought they were kind of reminiscent of us… It's pink venom, a lovely poison, it's words that most express us.” "Pink Venom" includes several lyrical references: Jennie opens the first verse with “Kick in the door, waving the coco," a play on the lyric “Kick in the door, wavin’ the .44” from the Notorious B.I.G.'s "Kick in the Door", while one of Lisa's verses interpolates the lyrics "One by one, then two by two" from Rihanna's "Pon de Replay".

Critical reception 

Jon Caramanica of The New York Times said that the song "has the comfort of anarchy." He added, "Every four bars, a new approach enters — familiar K-pop elasticity, loose Middle Eastern themes, gaudy rock, West Coast rap, and more. It exists out where maximalism moves past philosophy to aesthetic." Tanu I. Raj of NME said "Pink Venom" is a "promising preview of their new era." Lauren Puckett-Pope writing for Elle said, "The song is catchy but discombobulated, a disorienting blend of rap, floating vocals, and an anti-drop chorus, featuring a few choice Easter eggs in the lyrics." Pitchfork'''s Alex Ramos said that the song "impresses with its braggadocio and influences" and praised the use of lyrical references from the 1990s and ’00s. Ranking it as number 35 in their list of the top 100 songs of 2022, Rolling Stone called the song an "unbelievably fun raising-hell anthem full of Eighties hair-metal glam."

 Commercial performance 
"Pink Venom" debuted at number one on the Billboard Global 200 with 212.1 million streams and 36,000 downloads sold, earning Blackpink's first number-one on the chart and the second-biggest worldwide weekly streaming total in the chart's history. The song also debuted at number one on the Global Excl. U.S. with 198.1 million streams and 27,000 downloads sold outside the U.S., earning Blackpink their second number-one on the chart after "Lovesick Girls". With this, Blackpink became the third act to achieve multiple number-ones on the chart, after BTS and Justin Bieber. "Pink Venom" topped both charts for a second week with 108.4 million streams and 7,000 downloads worldwide, and 99.5 million streams and 5,000 downloads outside the U.S., becoming the first Korean-language song to top either chart for multiple weeks. The song topped the Global Excl. U.S. for a third week with 69.2 million streams and 3,000 downloads sold. Upon release, the song also broke the record for Spotify's most-streamed song by a female artist in a single day in 2022, with 10.79 million streams.

In South Korea, "Pink Venom" debuted at number 22 on the week 34 issue of the Circle Digital Chart for the period dated August 14–20, with less than two days of tracking. The following week, it rose to a peak at number two for the period dated August 21–27, becoming Blackpink's seventh top-two hit. In Japan, the song opened at number four on the Oricon Daily Digital Singles Chart for August 19. It went on to sell 3,236 downloads during the period dated August 15–21, debuting at number 16 on the weekly Digital chart, and accrued 3,068,603 streams as the 29th most-streamed song in the country that week. It debuted at number 22 on the Billboard Japan Hot 100 and peaked at number ten the following week, climbing 90–7 for radio, 58–14 for streaming, and 6–2 for video.

In Australia, "Pink Venom" debuted at number one on the ARIA Singles Chart dated August 29, making Blackpink the first K-pop group to top the chart and the first Korean artist to do so since Psy with "Gangnam Style". The song entered the US Billboard Hot 100 at number 22, marking Blackpink's highest-charting non-collaboration and their fourth top-40 entry. It debuted at number nine on Streaming Songs with 14.3 million streams, becoming the group's second top-ten on the chart, and at number three on Digital Song Sales with 11,000 downloads sold, and drew 359,000 in radio airplay audience in its first week. "Pink Venom" debuted at number 22 on the UK Singles Chart as well, the group's seventh top-forty hit in the United Kingdom. The song also debuted at number four on the Canadian Hot 100 chart, becoming Blackpink's first top-ten hit in the country.

Music video
A 24-second music video teaser for "Pink Venom" was released on August 17, 2022, followed by the official music video on August 19, both on Blackpink's official YouTube channel. The music video was directed by Seo Hyun-seung, a frequent collaborator with the group. Upon release, it reached 90.4 million views in 24 hours, surpassing the previous record held by their own track "How You Like That" (2020) for the most-viewed video by a female artist in a single day. It also scored the biggest music video premiere of 2022 and third-biggest of all time. The video achieved 100 million views in 29 hours, passing "How You Like That" as the fastest music video by a female artist to reach this mark. A behind-the-scenes video of filming was released on August 19.

At the beginning of the music video, Jisoo, wearing a hanbok with a contemporary spin, plays a melody on a geomungo while surrounded by rows of kneeling black-hooded figures wearing VR headsets and chanting the name "Blackpink". Jennie breaks through a concrete wall in a monster truck and struts down a red carpet in front of the truck wearing a sheer red gown. Afterwards, Lisa walks into a room inside a pyramid, where she picks a black apple from a tree and eats it; her eyes turn pink upon taking the first bite. Rosé appears in the next scene, pulling a black heart out of a stream of black water in a stormy environment. Lisa and Jennie then rap together; Lisa wears a streetwear-inspired cropped basketball shirt and denim overalls, and Jennie wears a cropped Manchester United F.C. jersey. During their subsequent verses, Jisoo portrays a vampire, and Rosé plays electric guitar in a fire-lit cave. In the chorus, the group members perform the choreography together in various settings, including a raging sandstorm and a jungle.

Dance practice
The dance practice video was released on August 23, 2022; the video consists of the four members doing the full choreography, surrounded by an ensemble of black-clad backup dancers. The performance was choreographed by Kiel Tuten and Sienna Lalau, who had previously worked with Twice, Aespa and BTS. In addition, "trendy dancers" such as YGX choreographer Leejung Lee and Taryn Cheng worked together to complete the project.

Accolades

 Live performances and promotion
On August 17, YG Entertainment unveiled a schedule for the group's "Light Up the Pink" campaign, in which several landmarks worldwide would be lit up in pink to promote the song, starting on August 18. On the same day, Blackpink teamed up with YouTube Shorts to launch "#PinkVenomChallenge", in celebration of pink venom music video release. On August 28, 2022, Blackpink performed "Pink Venom" for the first time on SBS's Inkigayo. The same day, Blackpink performed the track at the 2022 MTV Video Music Awards in Newark, marking their American awards show debut and making them the first female K-pop group in history to do so. Billboard'' ranked it the second best performance of the award show. On January 28, 2023, Blackpink performed "Pink Venom" with French cellist Gautier Capuçon at the Le Gala des Pièces Jaunes charity event organized by the First Lady of France, Brigitte Macron, in Paris.

Credits and personnel 
 Blackpink – vocals
 Teddy – composer, lyricist
 24 – composer, arranger
 R. Tee – composer, arranger
 Ido – composer, arranger
 Danny Chung – lyricist

Charts

Weekly charts

Monthly charts

Year-end charts

Sales

Release history

See also
 List of Billboard Global 200 number ones of 2022
 List of Inkigayo Chart winners (2022)
 List of K-pop songs on the Billboard charts
 List of number-one singles of 2022 (Australia)
 List of number-one songs of 2022 (Malaysia)
 List of number-one songs of 2022 (Singapore)
 List of most-viewed online videos in the first 24 hours
 List of M Countdown Chart winners (2022)
 List of Show Champion Chart winners (2022)

Notes

References

2022 songs
2022 singles
Blackpink songs
Billboard Global 200 number-one singles
Billboard Global Excl. U.S. number-one singles
Number-one singles in Australia
Number-one singles in India
Number-one singles in the Philippines
Number-one singles in Singapore
Songs written by Teddy Park
Interscope Records singles
YG Entertainment singles